Pierre-Paul Prud'hon (4 April 1758 – 16 February 16, 1823) was a French Romantic painter and draughtsman best known for his allegorical paintings and portraits such as Madame Georges Anthony and Her Two Sons (1796). He painted a portrait of each of Napoleon's two wives.

He was an early influence on Théodore Géricault.

Biography

Pierre-Paul Prud'hon was born in Cluny, Saône-et-Loire, France. He received his artistic training in the French provinces and went to Italy when he was twenty-six years old to continue his education. On his return to Paris, he found work decorating some private mansions. His work for wealthy Parisians led him to be held in high esteem at Napoleon's court.

His painting of Josephine portrays her not as an Empress, but as a lovely, attractive woman, which led some to think that he might have been in love with her. After the divorce of Napoleon and Josephine, he was also employed by Napoleon's second wife Marie-Louise.

Prud'hon was at times clearly influenced by Neo-classicism, at other times by Romanticism. He was appreciated by other artists and writers, including Stendhal, Delacroix, Millet and Baudelaire, for his chiaroscuro and convincing realism. He painted Crucifixion (1822) for St. Etienne's Cathedral in Metz; it now hangs in the Louvre.

The young Théodore Géricault had painted copies of work by Prud'hon, whose "thunderously tragic pictures" include his masterpiece, Justice and Divine Vengeance Pursuing Crime, where oppressive darkness and the compositional base of a naked, sprawled corpse obviously anticipate Géricault's painting The Raft of the Medusa.

Gallery

References

Further reading

General studies
Adapted from a following source: 
 
 
 
 
 
 
 
 
 
 

 
 
Reference works

External links

Europe in the age of enlightenment and revolution, a catalog from The Metropolitan Museum of Art Libraries (fully available online as PDF), which contains material on Prud'hon (see index)
Crucifixion at Web Gallery of Art
Pierre-Paul Prud’hon: Napoleon’s Draughtsman at Dulwich Picture Gallery, London

1758 births
1823 deaths
People from Saône-et-Loire
18th-century French painters
French male painters
19th-century French painters
French draughtsmen
French romantic painters
Burials at Père Lachaise Cemetery
19th-century French male artists
18th-century French male artists